Westmead may refer to:

Westmead, New South Wales, a suburb of Sydney
Westmead Hospital, a major hospital in Sydney
Westmead railway station, a railway station serving the suburb
USS Westmead (ID-3550), also spelled , a United States Navy cargo ship in commission from 1918 to 1919

See also
West Mead (disambiguation)